Café au lait (French for "coffee with milk") is coffee with hot milk added. It differs from white coffee, which is coffee with cold milk or other whiteners added.

Variations

Europe

In Italy, numerous variations go from a simple caffè latte to latte macchiato to cappuccino. In both Italian and Portuguese languages, there is a lot of further elaborate terminology for clarifying the desired strength of the coffee, its roasting, the temperature at which the final product is to be served, ... In the French-speaking areas of Switzerland, a popular variation is the café renversé (“reverse coffee"), or commonly just renversé, which is made by using the milk as a base and adding espresso, in reversal of the normal method of making a café au lait. In Andalusia, Southern Spain, a similar variation is called manchado (“stained"). In northern Europe, café au lait is the name most often used in coffee shops.

At home, café au lait can be prepared from dark coffee and heated milk; in cafés, it has been prepared on espresso machines from espresso and steamed milk ever since these machines became available in the 1940s—thus it merely refers to a "coffee and milk" combination, depending on the location, not to a specific drink.

Café au lait and caffè latte are used as contrasting terms, to indicate whether the beverage is served in the "French" or the "Italian" way, the former being in a white porcelain cup or bowl, the latter in a kitchen glass and always made from an espresso machine, whereas café au lait might be espresso- or dark coffee-based.

United States

In many American coffeehouses, a café au lait is a drink of strong drip brewed or French pressed coffee, to which steamed milk is added; this contrasts with a caffè latte, which uses espresso as a base. American café au lait is generally served in a cup, as with brewed coffee, being served in a bowl only at shops which wish to emphasize French tradition.

Café au lait is a popular drink in New Orleans, available at coffee shops like Café du Monde and Morning Call Coffee Stand, where it is made with milk and coffee mixed with chicory. Unlike the European café style, a New Orleans-style café au lait is made with scalded milk (milk warmed over heat to just below boiling), rather than with steamed milk. The use of roasted chicory root as an extender in coffee became common in Louisiana during the American Civil War, when Union naval blockades cut off the Port of New Orleans, forcing citizens to stretch out the coffee supply. In New Orleans, café au lait is traditionally drunk while eating beignets dusted with powdered sugar, which offsets the bitterness of the chicory. The taste for coffee and chicory was developed by the French during their civil war. Coffee was scarce during those times, and they found that chicory added body and flavor to the brew. The Acadians from Maritime Canada brought this taste and many other French customs (heritage) to Louisiana.

See also

 Cappuccino
 Flat white
 Latte
 List of coffee beverages

References

Coffee drinks